The discography of Dutch DJ and electronic music producer Martin Garrix consists of a studio album, two compilation albums, four extended plays (EP), three DJ mixes, 84 singles (including 11 under other aliases), 47 music videos and ten remixes. Part of the Dutch emergence of electronic dance music DJs, Garrix became widely known after his single "Animals" became a worldwide hit. It went number one in the United Kingdom, Belgium, and on the US Billboard Hot Dance Club Songs chart, and it reached the top ten of several charts across Europe from late 2013 to early 2014. Garrix is the youngest Dutch artist to ever have a number one single in the United Kingdom.

Garrix has collaborated with artists such as the Grammy Award-winning singer Usher, Dua Lipa, Bebe Rexha, Troye Sivan, and Khalid. He has also collaborated with fellow DJs such as Tiësto, Avicii, David Guetta, Afrojack, and Dimitri Vegas & Like Mike.

Studio albums

Compilation albums

Extended plays

DJ mixes

Singles

Notes

Music videos

Remixes

Production and songwriting credits

Releases under an alias

As Area21 (with Maejor)

As GRX

As Ytram

References

Discographies of Dutch artists
Electronic music discographies